The Wall (original title Le Mur) is a 1998 Belgian tragicomedy film, directed by Alain Berliner for the 2000, Seen By... series. The story is a surreal satirical allegory of the bi-lingual problems in Belgium.

Plot

Belgium, 1999. Albert is a 35-year old Walloon philosopher who works as a Belgian fries salesman. His store is located right on the Belgian language border. He serves his customers in Flanders and bakes his fries in Wallonia. Albert fancies the Flemish woman Wendy. After a new year celebration Albert wakes up and discovers to his horror that overnight a giant wall has been built on the language border, effectively separating Flanders from Wallonia. His store is therefore cut in half. As a citizen of Wallonia he is only able to travel to Flanders by using a visa...

Production
The film was made for the 2000, Seen By... project, initiated by the French company Hout et Court to produce films depicting the approaching turn of the millennium seen from the perspectives of 10 different countries.

Cast
 Daniel Hanssens: Albert
 Pascale Bal: Wendy
 Mil Seghers: Marcel
 Michael Pas: Stijn
 Peter Michel: Ivo
 Damien Gillard: Didier
 Peter Rouffaer: Fred
 Harry Cleven: Gréviste
 Dett Peyskens: Nicole
 Laurence Bibot: Journalist
 Daniël Van Avermaet: Negotiator
 Emile Ringoot: Soldier
 Bruno Van De Voorde: Flemish man
 François Lahaye: Walloon woman
 Julian Cope: Mel
 Michèle Laroque: The TV announcer

References

External links
 
 http://alainberliner.com/site/cat-en/features/le-mur/
 http://moria.co.nz/fantasy/wall1998-lemur.htm

1998 films
Belgian satirical films
Belgian political satire films
Belgian drama films
Belgian comedy films
Belgian romance films
Dystopian films
Films set in Belgium
Films shot in Belgium
Films set in the 1990s
Films directed by Alain Berliner